Chthonopes is a genus of southeast Asian ray spiders that was first described by J. Wunderlich in 2011.  it contains three species, found in caves of Laos, but can likely also be found in India and China: C. cavernicola, C. jaegeri, and C. thakekensis. They have several adaptations for darker environments, including pale coloration, long legs, and reduced lenses.

See also
 List of Theridiosomatidae species

References

Further reading

Araneomorphae genera
Spiders of Asia
Theridiosomatidae